"Driving Home for Christmas" is a Christmas song written and composed by British singer-songwriter Chris Rea. The first version was originally released as the B-side to his single "Hello Friend" in 1986. In October 1988, a re-recorded version served as one of two new songs on Rea's first compilation album New Light Through Old Windows. It was issued as the fourth single from the album in December 1988, where it peaked at number 53 on the UK Singles Chart as the lead track of The Christmas EP.

Despite its original modest chart placement, the song has made a reappearance on the UK Singles Chart every year since 2007 when it peaked at No. 33, and is featured among the Top 10 Christmas singles. It reached a new peak of number 10 on the UK Singles Chart in 2021. In a UK-wide poll in December 2012, it was voted twelfth on the ITV television special The Nation's Favourite Christmas Song.

The song has since been covered by numerous artists, including Engelbert Humperdinck. A 2011 version by Stacey Solomon peaked at number 27 on the UK Singles Chart.

Background
In interviews for the BBC Radio 4 programme Today in 2009, and The Guardian in 2016, Rea said he wrote "Driving Home for Christmas" many years before its first recording; this was in 1978 when Rea needed to get home to Middlesbrough from Abbey Road Studios in London. His wife had come down to drive him home in her Austin Mini to save money because it was cheaper to drive than travel by train. Rea was recently out of contract and the record company was unwilling to pay for the rail ticket. The inspiration for the song came as they were getting stuck in heavy traffic, while the snow was falling. He started looking at the other motorists, who "all looked so miserable. Jokingly, I started singing: "We're driving home for Christmas..." Then, whenever the streetlights shone inside the car, I started writing down lyrics". Rea said Driving Home for Christmas is a "car version of a carol", and that he wrote it for Van Morrison but did not manage to get it to him.

In the Guardian interview, Rea stated that he never played the song live until 2014 at Hammersmith Odeon; he recalls: "the gig was on 20 December, so the road crew kept badgering me to do it. I went, 'If I'm going to sing this fucking song, we're gonna do it properly.' So we hired 12 snow cannons. When we started the song, you couldn't hear it for the noise of the crowd, and we let go with the machines. We put three feet of artificial snow in the stalls. The venue charged me £12,000 to clean it up". 

It was used in Christmas commercials for supermarket chain Iceland in 1997, 1998 and 2011; the last featured a cover by Stacey Solomon. An alternative version of the single was released in Japan as part of an EP called 'Snow'.

Recording
Rea never planned to write a Christmas song. It was several years later that while testing pianos with keyboard player Max Middleton he found a tune that fitted the lyrics. Initially, it was released as a B-side (to the 1986 single "Hello Friend"), but afterwards was re-recorded with strings. Middleton played the distinctive jazzy intro, and together they produced a typical 1950s Christmas carol-type arrangement.

Music video
A video clip was broadcast on 23 December 1986 by Dutch pop music TV show TopPop, interspersed with stock footage of the motorways around Hilversum.

In 2009, 21 years after the song was first released, an original video was made in aid of Shelter; all proceeds from digital download were donated to the charity. The celebrities who featured in the video were Mike Read, David Hamilton, Martin Shaw, Kristian Digby, Gail Porter, Lizzie Cundy, Ewen MacIntosh, Carol Decker, Giles Vickers-Jones, and Lionel Blair. On the project, Rea stated: "I wanted to do something special this Christmas and what better way than to help keep a roof over people's heads when they need it most – at Christmas. By teaming up with Shelter we can hopefully make a difference".

Critical reception
Upon its release as a single in 1988, David Giles of Record Mirror described "Driving Home for Christmas" as a "jaunty, happy song" with "the joys of the season and some lilting ripples of guitar".

Track listings

Charts and certifications
In recent years it charted as follows: In 2008 on Netherlands Digital Songs (No. 4), Euro Digital Tracks (No. 8), in 2009 on Norway Digital Songs (No. 3), on Billboard Japan Hot 100 in 2012 (No. 18) and 2014 (No. 23), while on Denmark Digital Songs in 2016 (No. 9) and 2017 (No. 5). In 2022, the song entered the top 10 of the UK Singles Chart for the first time at number 10.

Charts

Certifications

Stacey Solomon version

Singer and television presenter Stacey Solomon covered the song in 2011 and it was released on 18 December 2011 as her debut single. Originally intended to be used solely in commercials for supermarket chain Iceland and cabins, it was later released as a single due to popular demand, reaching number 27.

Background
The single was released on 18 December 2011 on iTunes with all proceeds going to Alzheimer's Research UK and children's hospice charity Together For Short Lives. She subsequently said that she was not disappointed that the single did not make it into the UK top 20.

Track listing

Charts

Other versions
Other artists who have covered the song include:
 The Bachelors
 Michael Ball
 Joe McElderry
 Saint Etienne
 The High Kings
 Lucy Rose
 Casanovas
 Gavin James
 Engelbert Humperdinck
Dermot Kennedy
Tom Grennan
The Overtones
Nathan Evans
Mario Biondi
Fady Maalouf
Cesar Sampson
Dennis van Aarssen

In popular culture
The Chris Rea and Stacey Solomon versions of "Driving Home for Christmas" were used in the Christmas adverts for supermarket chain Iceland in 1997 and 2011 respectively.

In December 2020, a joke about Dominic Cummings' journey to Durham during the coronavirus lockdown, which referenced the song in the punchline, was announced as the winner of UK TV channel Gold's annual "Christmas Cracker Joke" competition. The joke read: "What is Dominic Cummings' favourite Christmas song? 'Driving Home for Christmas'".

References

External links

1986 songs
1988 singles
2011 debut singles
British Christmas songs
Chris Rea songs
Joe McElderry songs
Magnet Records singles
Songs about cars
Songs written by Chris Rea